The Bell Bay aluminium smelter is located on the Tamar River at Bell Bay, Tasmania, Australia. The smelter has a production capacity of 178,000 tonnes of aluminium per year.

It is owned and operated by Pacific Aluminium, a wholly owned subsidiary of Rio Tinto Alcan.

History
The Bell Bay smelter commenced production in 1955 as a joint venture between the Commonwealth and Tasmanian governments. The smelter was the first built in the Southern Hemisphere primarily to overcome difficulties importing aluminium during wartime. Bell Bay was chosen as the location because of the available hydroelectric power and deep water facilities. Rio Tinto Aluminium purchased the smelter in 1960, when production was about 12,000 tonnes per year.

The original potline (Line 1) used British Aluminium 
Söderberg technology. It 
was converted to use
prebake anodes in 1965 and shut down in 1981.

Technology
The smelter currently comprises three potlines of 
Kaiser P-57 reduction cells

Line 2 and Line 3 were built in the early 1960s. Line 4 was built
in two stages in the early 1980s.

See also 
 Rio Tinto Aluminium
 Aluminium smelting
 List of aluminium smelters

References

External links 
 Rio Tinto corporate web site
 Bell Bay in its element as aluminium smelter powers on, Bruce Mounster, 14 December 2013, The Mercury.

Industrial buildings in Tasmania
Aluminium smelters in Australia
Alcan
Energy crisis, 2016
1955 establishments in Australia